Maingon is a French surname. Notable people with the surname include:

Charles Maingon (1942–2018), Canadian judoka and professor
Guy Maingon (born 1948), French cyclist
 (born 1980), writer and director

French-language surnames